The Odisha Rural Housing & Development Corporation or ORHDC, was established on 19 August 1994 as a Public Sector Undertaking of Government of Odisha. Odisha Rural Housing & Development Corporation (ORHDC) acquired a certificate for Commencement of Business from Registrar of Companies, Orissa, on 23 September 1994.

Odisha Rural Housing & Development Corporation's main principal was financing, promoting, developing rural housing, related activities and act as a coordinator with the objective of upgradation and building cost effective houses with the technology developed in the Building Centres.

Schemes
 Kalinga Kutir Scheme
 Credit Linked Housing Scheme
 Individual Housing Loan Scheme 
 Corporate Housing Loan Scheme
 Project Finance Scheme
 Building Centre Scheme

References

External links
 Official Website of Odisha Rural Housing & Development Corporation (ORHDC)

Housing finance companies of India
State agencies of Odisha
Rural development organisations in India
1994 establishments in Orissa
Government agencies established in 1994